Ocumare del Tuy is a city located in Miranda State in northern Venezuela, the shire town of the Lander Municipality. Ocumare del Tuy is noted for warm and clear weather, with year-round sunshine and 60 days of rainfall annually, and an average temperature that ranges from 64 to 83 °F (18 to 28 °C), but with relatively low humidity.

Ocumare del Tuy has a population of around 160,000 (2005), mainly dedicated to agriculture (cocoa, coffee, sugar cane) and livestock farming (pigs, but also cattle), with leafy forest and meadows.

Ocumare del Tuy was the capital of the state of Miranda between 1904 and 1928, when it moved to Petare and later to Los Teques.

Notable people
 Ozzie Guillén, Former Chicago White Sox manager
 Anthony Ortega, who played for the Los Angeles Angels of Anaheim  
 Gregorio Petit, who played for several Major League Baseball teams
Gregory Vargas (born 1986), basketball player in the Israel Basketball Premier League
 Danry Vasquez, who played for several Major League Baseball teams, and was released following publication of a surveillance video showing him assaulting a woman.

Cities in Miranda (state)